Qeqertarsuatsiaat, formerly Fiskenæsset or Fiskernæs, is a settlement in the Sermersooq municipality in southwestern Greenland, located on an island off the shores of Labrador Sea. Its population was 169 in 2020.

History 

Kikertarsocitsiak or Qeqertarsuatsiaat has long been the local name for the island (Kalaallisut: "Rather Large Islands"). It was first settled by the Danes as Fiskernæs in 1754. The name was often anglicized as Fisher's Inlet.

The trading post was founded by the merchant Anders Olsen on behalf of the Danish General Trade Company, which was granted a royal monopoly on trade in Greenland but only in and around its settlements. Like most Greenlandic trading posts, it was a location for the Danes to trade imported goods for seal skins and seal and whale blubber gathered by Kalaallit in the area. Unusually, the settlement became the early center of Greenland's salmon and cod fisheries and it was as common to see the large "woman's boat" or umiak as the smaller hunting kayaks.

In 1748, 1754, 1757, or 1758, the Moravian mission of Lichtenfels was established in another inlet of the same island by Matthias Stach and four families from New Herrnhut. The first conversions were not made until 1760 or 1761, but afterwards the population of the settlement rose to around 300 and was for a time the largest village in Greenland. All urbanization in Greenland was negatively affected by the Royal Greenland Trading Department (KGH)'s Instruction of 1782, aimed at protecting the company's income by maintaining the Inuit in their traditional roles as nomadic hunters. The mission was surrendered to the Lutheran Church of Denmark in 1900 and has since been abandoned.

The last known great auk in Greenland was hunted near Fiskenæsset in 1815 by one of the villagers.

Transport and amenities
Qeqertarsuatsiaat is a port of call for the Arctic Umiaq Line ferry. There is a viewpoint at Telehuset. The Danish Crown Princely family visited the town as part of an official tour of Greenland in summer 2014.

Mining
 a mine employing 30 people in the mining of pink sapphire and rubies from the Aappaluttoq deposit was under development by True North Gems Greenland, a Canadian firm, near Qeqertarsuatsiaat.

Population 
Qeqertarsuatsiaat has lost population in the last two decades: more than a quarter since 1990 and almost 10 percent since 2000.

References

Populated places in Greenland
Populated places established in 1754
1754 establishments in the Danish colonial empire